Auxonne station is a railway station in the commune of Auxonne, in the French department of Côte-d'Or, in the Bourgogne-Franche-Comté region. It is an intermediate stop on the Dijon–Vallorbe line of SNCF.

Services
The following services stop at Auxonne:

References

External links 
 
 

Railway stations in Côte-d'Or